María Julieta Kirkwood Bañados (5 April 1936 – 8 April 1985) was a Chilean sociologist , political scientist, university professor and  feminist activist. She is considered one of the founders and impellers of the Chilean feminist movement in the 1980s. She is considered the forerunner of Gender studies in Chile.

Life and work 
Daughter of Johnny Kirkwood and Julieta Bañados, she was a professor and researcher at the Latin American Faculty of Social Sciences (FLACSO). Her work constitute  theoretical and historical reference works in the field of the study of the feminist movement in Chile and in Latin America: Ser política en Chile: las feministas y los partidos, Tejiendo rebeldías and Feminarios. She collaborated to the magazine Furia and to the Boletín del Círculo de Estudios de la Mujer.

Her theoretical work studied gender issues from a feminist point of view. She criticized the conservative feminist discourse while incorporating the Latin American culture from an interculturality perspective.

As an activist, she participated in several organisations defending the Woman's rights, among which the Círculo de Estudios de la Mujer and the MEMCh 83. She was also one of the founders of the Feminist Movement opposing the dictatorship of Augusto Pinochet, which motto she help promoting with Margarita Pisano was "Democracy in the country, in the house and in the bed".

Publications 
 Chile: la mujer en la formulación política (Santiago: FLACSO, 1981).
 Feminarios (Santiago: Documentas, 1987).
 El feminismo como negación del autoritarismo (Santiago: FLACSO, 1983).
 Feminismo y participación política en Chile (Santiago: FLACSO, 1982).
 Feministas y políticas (Santiago: FLACSO, 1984).
 Los nudos de la sabiduría feminista (Santiago: FLACSO, 1984).
 La política del feminismo en Chile (Santiago: FLACSO, 1983).
 Ser política en Chile : las feministas y los partidos (Santiago: LOM Ediciones, 1982, 1986 y 2010).
 Ser política en Chile : los nudos de la sabiduría feminista (Santiago: Cuarto Propio, 1990).
 Tejiendo rebeldías : escritos feministas de Julieta Kirkwood (Santiago: CEM, 1987).

References 

Chilean activists
Chilean women activists
Chilean people of English descent
1985 deaths
1936 births
Academic staff of the University of Chile
People from Santiago
Chilean sociologists
Chilean women sociologists
Chilean feminist writers